The 2022–23 season is the 32nd season of competitive association football in Ukraine since dissolution of the Soviet Union.

Following the Russian invasion of Ukraine and declaration of martial law in the country, the last season was interrupted and it was not certain whether or not next season would take place. Soon after the Russian forces were repelled from the northern Ukraine and Kyiv area, it was announced that the Ukrainian Association of Football (UAF) encourages for clubs to restart the season. The UAF approved round-robin tournaments in all national league competitions under strict safety precautions, yet it was decided not to carry out competitions of single eliminations.

Usually starting with the season opening match of the Ukrainian Super Cup, the 2022–23 season started on the Ukrainian Flag Day 23 August 2022 with Round 1 games of the Ukrainian Premier League.

National teams

Ukraine national football team

Friendlies

Ukraine U-21 national football team

UEFA European Under-21 Championship

Ukraine women's national football team

UEFA competitions

UEFA Champions League

Qualifying phase and play-off round

Second qualifying round

|}

Third qualifying round

|}

Play-off round

|}

Group stage

Group B

UEFA Europa League

Qualifying phase and play-off round

Play-off round

|}

Group stage

Group B

UEFA Europe Conference League

Qualifying phase and play-off round

Second qualifying round

|}

Third qualifying round

|}

Group stage

Group B

UEFA Women's Champions League

Qualifying round

Round 1

Both games of Round 1 took place at Stadion Varteks, Varaždin

Semi-finals

|}

Final

|}

Round 2

Both games of Round 2 took place at Loro Boriçi Stadium, Shkodër

|}

Men's club football
Due to emergency situation in the country in general, the PFL of Ukraine made some changes to its competitions and league pyramid changing the second tier to multi-group competition and the third tier to single group competition. This is the first time the second-tier competition organized in multi group format since the very first championship of 1992.

Note: For all scratched clubs, see section Clubs removed for more details

Premier League

PFL League 1 (First League)

Group A

Group B

Promotion group

Relegation group

PFL League 2 (Second League)

Women's club football

 On 10 September 2022, WFC Zhytlobud-2 Kharkiv has officially transformed into a women team of FC Vorskla Poltava.

Note: For the scratched clubs, see section Clubs removed for more details

Vyshcha Liha

Managerial changes 
This is a list of managerial changes among Ukrainian professional football clubs:

Clubs removed

Notes

References 

 
Seasons in Ukrainian football
2022 sport-related lists
2023 sport-related lists